The phonology of the open back vowels of the English language has undergone changes both overall and with regional variations, through Old and Middle English to the present. The sounds heard in modern English were significantly influenced by the Great Vowel Shift, as well as more recent developments such as the cot–caught merger.

Overview

Old and Middle English
In the Old English vowel system, the vowels in the open back area were unrounded: . There were also rounded back vowels of mid-height: .

As the Old English (OE) system developed into that of Middle English (ME), the OE short vowel  merged with the fronted  to become a more central ME . Meanwhile, the OE long vowel  was rounded and raised to ME . Alternative developments were also possible; see English historical vowel correspondences for details.

Remaining instances of the short vowel  also tended to become lower. Hence in Late Middle English (around 1400) the following open back vowels were present, distinguished by length:
 , spelt , as in dog, god
 , often spelt , or  before consonant+vowel or certain consonant pairs, as in boat, whole, old

16th-century changes
By 1600, the following changes had occurred:
 At this time, the short  in dog was lowered to 

There were thus two open back monophthongs: 
  as in lot

and one open back diphthong: 
  as in low

17th-century changes
By 1700, the following further developments had taken place:
Before , this change was later undone by the horse–hoarse merger except in some varieties, as currently seen in Irish English, Scottish English and African American Vernacular English.
The shift was suppressed before a velar consonant, as in quack, twang, wag, wax, and also was suppressed in swam (the irregular past tense of swim).
  had begun to partake in lengthening and raising before a nonprevocalic voiceless fricative or /r/.
 However, when  preceded , as in laugh and half,  was shifted to  instead, derived from Middle English .
 An unrounded back vowel  developed, found in certain classes of words that had previously had , like start, father and palm.

That left the standard form of the language with four open back vowels:
  in lot and want.
 in cloth and cost.
 in start, father and palm.
  in tor, cause, and corn.

Later changes
From the 18th century on, the following changes have occurred:
 In many accents of England, the lengthening of the  set was undone, restoring the short pronunciation . This became standard RP by the mid-20th century.
 In General American, the lot vowel has become unrounded and merged into  (the father–bother merger).

This leaves RP with three back vowels:
  in lot, want, cloth, and cost.
  in tor, cause, and corn.
  in start, father, and palm.

and General American with two:
  in lot, want, start, father, and palm.
  in tor, cause, corn, cloth and cost.

Unrounded  
In a few varieties of English, the vowel in lot is unrounded, pronounced toward [].  This is found in the following dialects:
 Irish English
 Much of the Caribbean
 Norwich
 The West Country and the West Midlands of England
 Most of North American English
 Excluding Boston and Western Pennsylvania accents, in which it is typically raised toward , merging with the vowel in thought.

Linguists disagree as to whether the unrounding of the lot vowel occurred independently in North America (probably occurring around the end of the 17th century) or was imported from certain types of speech current in Britain at that time.

However, the major exception to this is North American English, where the vowel is lengthened to merge with the vowel in palm, as described below. This merger is called the  merger or more commonly the father–bother merger. (See further below.)

Father–bother merger 
The father–bother merger is unrounded lot taken a step further.  On top of being unrounded, the length distinction between the vowel in lot and bother and the vowel in palm and father is lost, so that the two groups merge.

This occurs in the great majority of North American accents; of the North American dialects that have unrounded lot, the only notable exception to the merger is New York City English, where the opposition with the -type vowel is somewhat tenuous.

Examples of possible homophones resulting from the merger include Khan and con as well as Saab and sob.

While the accents in northeastern New England, such as the Boston accent, also remain unmerged, lot remains rounded and merges instead with cloth and thought, though the outcome of that is still a longish free vowel that is heard as thought by British speakers.

split 
The  split is the result of a late 17th-century sound change that lengthened  to  before voiceless fricatives, and also before  in the word gone. The sound change is most consistent in the last syllable of a word, and much less so elsewhere (see below). Some words that entered the language later, especially when used more in writing than speech, are exempt from the lengthening, e.g. joss and Goth with the short vowel.

The cot–caught merger, discussed below, has removed the distinction in some dialects.

As a result of the lengthening and raising, in the above-mentioned accents cross rhymes with sauce, and soft and cloth also have the vowel . Accents affected by this change include American English accents that lack the cot-caught merger and, originally, RP, although today words of this group almost always have short  in RP.  The split still exists in some older RP speakers.

Its actual phonetic realization may be open , whereas the lot vowel may be realized as central . Some words vary as to which vowel they have.

There are also significant complexities in the pronunciation of written o occurring before one of the triggering phonemes  in a non-final syllable. However, the use of the open o as opposed to the short o is largely predictable. Just like with /æ/-tensing and the trap–bath split, there seems to be an open-syllable constraint. Hence  occurs in crossing, crosser, crosses because it occurs in cross; likewise in longing, longer, longest because it occurs in long. However, possible, jostle, impostor, profit, Gothic, bongo, Congo, and boggle all have . However, there are still exceptions in words like Boston and foster. A further list of words is mentioned in the table below:

Some words may vary depending on the speaker like (coffee, offer, donkey, soggy, boondoggle, etc. with either  or ).  Meanwhile, other words vary by region.  For example, in the Mid-Atlantic U.S. dialect, most famously spoken in metropolitan Philadelphia and Baltimore, the single word on (pronounced  in General American) rhymes with dawn :  (in the mid-Atlantic, this vowel is diphthongized to ). Labov et al. regard this phenomenon as occurring not just in the Mid-Atlantic region, but in all regions south of a geographic boundary that they identify as the ON line, which is significant because it distinguishes most varieties of Northern American English (in which on and Don are closer rhymes) from most varieties of Midland and Southern American English (in which on and dawn are closer rhymes).

Cot–caught merger

The cot–caught merger (also known as the low back merger or the  merger) is a phonemic merger occurring in many English accents, where the vowel sound in words like cot, nod, and stock (the  vowel), has merged with that of caught, gnawed, and stalk (the  vowel). For example, with the merger, cot and caught become perfect homophones.

Other changes

merger 

The  merger is a merger of the English vowels  and  that occurs in Bradford English and sometimes also in Geordie and Northern Welsh English.

merger 

It is possible only in fast speech.

merger 

split 

Originally-open syllables with an inflectional suffix (such as bored) retain the lower vowel quality, creating minimal pairs such as bored  vs. board .

In broad Geordie, some  words (roughly, those spelled with a, as in walk and talk) have  (which phonetically is the long counterpart of  ) instead of the standard . Those are the traditional dialect forms which are being replaced with the standard .  is therefore not necessarily a distinct phoneme in the vowel system of Geordie, also because it occurs as an allophone of  before voiced consonants.

Distribution of /ɑː/ 
In dialects with the trap–bath split (such as Received Pronunciation, New Zealand English and South African English), it also corresponds to GA , which means that it can also be spelled  before voiceless fricatives.
Those dialects have the cot–caught merger in addition to the father-bother merger (though a tiny minority of speakers lack the latter merger, like Scottish English).

In many Scottish dialects, there is just one unrounded open vowel  that has two allophones.

For the sake of simplicity, instances of an unrounded  vowel (phonetically ) that do not merge with / are excluded from the table below. For this reason, the traditional Norfolk dialect is included but the contemporary one, nor the Cardiff dialect, are not.

Fronted /oʊ/ 

In many dialects of English, the vowel  has undergone fronting.  The exact phonetic value varies.  Dialects with the fronted  include Received Pronunciation; Southern, Midland, and Mid-Atlantic American English; and Australian English.  This fronting does not generally occur before , a relatively retracted consonant.

Table

See also

 Phonological history of the English language
 Phonological history of English vowels

Notes

References

Bibliography
 
 
 
 

Scottish English
American English
English language in Canada
Splits and mergers in English phonology
Sociolinguistics